Slavkov is a municipality and village in Opava District in the Moravian-Silesian Region of the Czech Republic. It has about 2,100 inhabitants.

History
The first written mention of Slavkov is from 1224.

References

External links

Villages in Opava District